"Free Ride" is a song written by Dan Hartman and performed by The Edgar Winter Group. The single, engineered by Jim Reeves, was a top 15 U.S. hit in 1973, hitting number 14 on the Billboard Hot 100 and number 10 on Cash Box. In Canada, it peaked at number eight.

Background
The single 45 version is distinctly different from the LP version. The 45 version contains a significantly brighter guitar track (that opens the song only on the left channel), added harmonics, a fuzz bass added to the bridge and other changes that contrast sharply with the "dry" LP mix. Most classic rock radio stations play the LP version, and the original 45 mix is much less commonly available online. Both versions clock in at virtually the same length because each was based on the same core "take" and remixed with different tracks to the fore as well as added enhancements to the single.

Personnel  
 Edgar Winter – clavinet, electric piano, backing vocals, ARP 2600 synthesizer
 Ronnie Montrose – lead guitar, backing vocals
 Dan Hartman – lead vocals, rhythm guitar, percussions
 Randy Jo Hobbs – bass guitar
 Johnny Badanjek – drums

Other versions 

Tavares recorded a version of the song for their 1975 album, In the City.  Their version would peak at #52 on the Billboard Hot 100 and #8 on the Hot Soul Singles chart.

Audio Adrenaline recorded a version of the song for their 1996 album, Bloom.

Hartman himself re-recorded the song and released it on his 1979 album Relight My Fire.

Charts

Weekly charts
Edgar Winter Group

Tavares

Year-end charts

In popular culture
The song was featured in Air America and in The Drew Carey Show episode "The Dog and Pony Show". The song is featured in the 1993 film, Dazed and Confused while Hartman's recording appeared in Mighty Morphin Power Rangers: The Movie and on its soundtrack album. The song is on Rock Band 3 as downloadable content along with "Frankenstein". Song was also used in 2006 video game Cars as well as Grand Theft Auto IV: The Lost and Damned. In 2022 the song was included on the soundtrack of The Black Phone.

References

External links
 

1972 songs
1973 singles
1975 singles
1979 singles
The Edgar Winter Group songs
Tavares (group) songs
Songs written by Dan Hartman
Epic Records singles
Capitol Records singles